TYPO3 is a free and open-source Web content management system written in PHP. It is released under the GNU General Public License. It can run on a variety of web servers, such as Apache, Nginx or IIS, and on top of many operating systems, including Linux, Microsoft Windows, FreeBSD, macOS and OS/2.

TYPO3 is similar to other popular content management systems such as, Drupal, Joomla! and WordPress. It is used more widely in Europe than in other regions, with larger market share in German-speaking countries.

TYPO3 is credited to be highly flexible, as code and content are run separately.  It can be extended by new functions without writing any program code. TYPO3 supports publishing content in multiple languages due to its built-in localization system. Due to its features like editorial workplace and workflow, advanced frontend editing, scalability and maturity, TYPO3 classifies itself as an enterprise level content management system.

History and usage
TYPO3 was initially authored by the Dane Kasper Skårhøj in 1997. It is now developed by over 300 contributors under the lead of Benjamin Mack (Core team leader) and Mathias Schreiber (Product Owner).

Calculations from the TYPO3 Association show that it is currently used in more than 500,000 installations. The number of installations detected by the public website "CMS Crawler" was around 384,000 by February 2017.

Features 
TYPO3 provides a base set of interfaces, functions and modules. Most functionality exceeding the base set needs extensions. More than 5000 extensions are currently available for TYPO3 for download under the GNU General Public License from a repository called the TYPO3 Extension Repository, or TER.

TYPO3 can run on most HTTP servers such as Apache, Nginx or IIS on top of Linux, Microsoft Windows or macOS. It uses PHP 7.2 or newer and any relational database supported by the TYPO3 DBAL including MySQL, MariaDB, PostgreSQL, and SQLite. Some 3rd-party extensions  not using the database API  support MySQL as the only database engine.
The system can be run on any web server with at least 256 MB RAM and a CPU appropriate for that RAM. The backend can be displayed in any modern browser with JavaScript. There is no browser restriction for displaying user-oriented content generated by TYPO3.

Since version 4.5, TYPO3 is published with a demo website called "Introduction Package". The websites serves as a tutorial for setting up a working example website and allows experimenting with built-in features. The package can be enabled from the install tool.

Building basic proficiency in TYPO3 needs between a few weeks up to some months. For an author or editor who administers and operates a TYPO3 based website, this requirement can range from a few minutes to a few hours. A developer setting up a website with TYPO3 would need to work intensively with the meta-language TypoScript.

System architecture
Conceptually, TYPO3 consists of two parts: the frontend, visible to visitors, and the administrative backend. The frontend displays the web content. The backend is responsible for administration and managing content. The core functions of TYPO3 include user privileges and user roles, timed display control of content (show/hide content elements), a search function for static and dynamic content, search-engine friendly URLs, an automatic sitemap, multi-language capability for frontend and backend, and more.

Like most modern CMSes, TYPO3 follows the policy of separation of content and layout: The website content is stored in a relational database, while the page templates are stored on the file system. Therefore, both can be managed and updated separately.

TYPO3 defines various basic types of content data. Standard content elements are described as text, text with media, images, (plain) HTML, video etc. Various additional types of content elements can be handled using extensions.

The fundamental content unit is a "page". Pages represent a URL in the frontend and are organized hierarchically in the backends' page tree. Standard pages serve as "containers" for one or multiple content elements. There are several additional special page types, including:
 shortcuts (they show content from another page)
 mount points (that insert a part of the page tree at the mount point)
 external URLs
 system folders (to handle complex data such as registered users)

Internally, TYPO3 is managed by various PHP arrays. They contain all the information necessary to generate HTML code from the content stored in the database. This is achieved by a unique configuration language called TypoScript.

Design elements
Designing and developing with TYPO3 is commonly based on the following elements, among others:

 Page tree
 Representation of all pages of a site, their structure and properties.
 Constants
 System-wide configuration parameters
 Template
 Since TYPO3 6, the system runs on the templating engine Fluid. Fluid combines HTML markup with conditions and control structures. It can be extended by custom view helpers written in PHP.

 Until version 4.3, an HTML skeleton was used, with markers (e.g., ###MARKER###) and range markers, called subparts (e.g., <!-- ###CONTENT### Start --> … <!-- ###CONTENT### End -->); that were replaced by various content elements or served as a subtemplate. This template system can still be found in older extensions or installations.

 TypoScript
 TypoScript is a purely declarative configuration language. In Typoscript, configuration values are defined, which are parsed into a system-wide PHP array. TypoScript is object-based and organized in a tree-like structure.
 Extensions
 Additional plug-ins to enable additional functions. See Extensions.
 PHP
 As TYPO3 CMS is written in PHP, therefore most features can be modified or extended by experienced users. Mentionable here is the XCLASS mechanism, by which classes and methods can be overwritten and extended. If available, hooks are preferred.

Extensions
Extensions are the cornerstone in the internal architecture of TYPO3. A feature that was introduced with version 3.5 in 2003 is the Extension Manager, a control center managing all TYPO3 extensions. The division between the TYPO3 core and the extensions is an important concept which determined the development of TYPO3 in the past years. Extensions are designed in a way so they can supplement the core seamlessly. This means that a TYPO3 system will appear as a unit while actually being composed of the core application and a set of extensions providing various features.

They can be downloaded from the online repository (TER) directly from the backend, and are installed and updated with a few clicks. Every extension is identified by a unique extension key (for example, tt_news). Also, developers can share new or modified extensions by uploading them to the repository.

Generally, extensions are written in PHP. The full command set of PHP 5.3 can be used (regarded the system requirements of the specific TYPO3 version), but TYPO3 also provides several library classes for better efficiency: Best known and most used is the piBase library class. With introduction of TYPO3 4.3 in 2009, piBase has been replaced (or extended) by the Extbase library, which is a modern, MVC-based development framework. To ensure backwards compatibility, both libraries can be used in the same TYPO3 installation. Extbase itself is a backport of some features of FLOW3, a general web application framework.

Notable projects 

As it classifies as an enterprise CMS, many global companies and organisations base their web or intranet sites on TYPO3. The majority is based in German-speaking countries, such as the state of Saxony-Anhalt, the German Green Party, the University of Lucerne (Switzerland), the University of Vienna (Austria) and the Technical University of Berlin. International organisations running one or more TYPO3 sites are: Airbus, Konica-Minolta, Leica Microsystems, Air France, Greenpeace and Meda (Sweden).

Releases

Version history

Neos
A completely rewritten version (code-named "Phoenix") was originally planned as TYPO3 version 5.0. While working on this new release and analyzing the 10-year history and complexity of TYPO3 v4, the TYPO3 community decided to branch out version 5 as a completely separate product, one that wouldn't replace version 4 in the near future and as such needed to have its own name. Published as FLOW3, it along with various other packages then served as the basis for the start of development of project Phoenix.

In September 2012, the TYPO3 developers decided on the name for the new product, "TYPO3 Neos". With TYPO3 Neos 1.0 alpha1, a public test version was released in late 2012. In May 2015 the TYPO3 Association and the Neos team decided to go separate ways, with TYPO3 CMS remaining the only CMS product endorsed by the Association and the Neos team publishing Neos as a stand-alone CMS without any connection to the TYPO3 world.

In January 2017, Neos 3.0 has been published, along with a new version of Flow framework and a name change of its configuration language from TypoScript2 to Fusion.

See also

 Content management
 Content management system
 List of content management systems
 TCPDF library for generating PDF documents with TYPO3
 Pages in category TYPO3

References

Further reading
 Michael Peacock – Building Websites with TYPO3 (Paperback) – 
 Michael Schams, Patrick Lobacher - TYPO3 Extbase: Modern Extension Development for TYPO3 CMS with Extbase & Fluid (Paberback) - 
 Rene Fritz, Daniel Hinderink, Werner Altmann – TYPO3: Enterprise Content Management (Paperback) –

External links

 
 
 TYPO3 Forge - Git Repositories, SVN Repositories, Bugtracker, Documentation and Wiki for the TYPO3 Core and Extensions
 TYPO3 Wiki
 TYPO3 References Blog
 TYPO3 Videos for Editors (Series of 22 TYPO3 video tutorials to version 4.2) - supplemented by a TYPO3 test website

 
Free content management systems
Content management systems
Free software programmed in PHP
PHP frameworks
Blog software
Cross-platform free software